Viking saga or variations, may refer to:

 Sagas of the Vikings
 , now Celestyal Crystal, a cruiseship
 The Viking Sagas, a 1995 American film
 A Viking Saga, a 2008 film about Oleg of Novgorod
 Northmen: A Viking Saga, a 2014 film
 Saga: Rage of the Vikings, a 1998 videogame
 Viking Saga (newspaper), a school newspaper in Nebraska, U.S.
Viking Saga censorship incident

See also
 
 
 Saga (disambiguation)
 Viking (disambiguation)